Ali Boussaboun (born 11 June 1979) is a Dutch-Moroccan former professional footballer who played as a striker. After retiring from playing, Boussaboun worked as a scout for the Moroccan football federation.

Career
Boussaboun was born in Tangier, Morocco. He has played for ADO Den Haag, FC Groningen, NAC Breda, Feyenoord, Al-Wakrah Sports Club, FC Utrecht and Al-Nasr Sports Club. He joined the Dubai-based club in July 2009, after his contract with FC Utrecht expired. He returned to the Netherlands after one year, signing a contract with NAC Breda in the Eredivisie.

References

External links

1979 births
Living people
Moroccan footballers
Morocco international footballers
Moroccan expatriate footballers
ADO Den Haag players
FC Groningen players
NAC Breda players
Feyenoord players
FC Utrecht players
Eredivisie players
Derde Divisie players
Expatriate footballers in Qatar
Moroccan emigrants to the Netherlands
People from Tangier
Al-Wakrah SC players
Al-Nasr SC (Dubai) players
Association football forwards
Qatar Stars League players
UAE Pro League players
Moroccan expatriate sportspeople in Qatar
Haaglandia players